St Ann's is a neighbourhood in Tottenham, north London, England, in the London Borough of Haringey. It is located to the east of Harringay and West Green and is within, but distinct from, St Ann's ward.

Location
St Ann's extends from Chestnuts Park in the west to Seven Sisters Road in the east. To the south, its boundary is defined by the London Overground railway line.

History
St. Ann's Church was built in a rural setting in the middle of the nineteenth century and consecrated in 1861. A hamlet soon began to grow up around the church. However, it was quickly swallowed up by the northward march of London. By the mid-1890s, it could no longer be distinguished as a separate hamlet.

Education

Nearest places
 South Tottenham
 West Green
 Seven Sisters
 Stamford Hill
 Harringay

Transport

Nearest tube and rail stations
 Seven Sisters tube and railway station
 South Tottenham railway station
 Stamford Hill railway station
 Harringay Green Lanes railway station

References

Districts of the London Borough of Haringey
Areas of London